Act for Trentino (Agire per il Trentino) was a regionalist political party active in Trentino.

History
The party was founded in June 2016, with its main goals being fighting against waste, determining precise rules on moral issues and self-financing, establishing a deep bond with the autonomist culture and the territories, and defending the weakest groups of the population. The leader of the new party was Claudio Cia, a provincial councilor who controversially left the Trentino Civic List a month earlier. The other founders of the party were Alessandro Boller, Cinzia Bazzanella, Franca Penasa, Giambattista Pastore, Matteo Rigotti, Michele Azzetti, Paolo Peruzzini, Roberto Pergher, Sandro Bordignon, Sergio Manuel Binelli and Tiziano Salvini.

In October 2018, the party participated in the provincial election in Trentino within the centre-right coalition, in support of Maurizio Fugatti's candidacy, and obtained 2.14% of the votes and one seat (assigned to the leader Claudio Cia). 

In the occasion of the municipal elections of September 2020, the party supported Marcello Carli's candidacy for mayor of Trento together with the Renaissance party, but it scored only 1.68% of the votes and no seats.

In December 2020, Act for Trentino officially merged into the Brothers of Italy party.

Electoral results

Trentino provincial elections

References

External links
Official website

Political parties in Trentino
Political parties established in 2016
Political parties disestablished in 2020
Christian democratic parties in Italy